Mohammad Jakalan  is a Syrian football midfielder who played for Syria in the 1988 Asian Cup.

International Record

References

Living people
Syrian footballers
1988 AFC Asian Cup players
Association football midfielders
Syrian Premier League players
Syria international footballers
1961 births